"Photograph" is a song by Canadian rock band Nickelback. It was released on August 8, 2005, as the first single from their fifth studio album, All the Right Reasons. The song reached the top ten in Australia, Austria, Belgium, the Netherlands, New Zealand, and the United States.

Background
The song is mostly autobiographical. Singer Chad Kroeger said, "It's just nostalgia, growing up in a small town, and you can't go back to your childhood. Saying goodbye to friends that you've drifted away from, where you grew up, where you went to school, who you hung out with and the dumb stuff you used to do as a kid, the first love — all of those things. Everyone has one or two of those memories that they are fond of, so this song is really just the bridge for all that."

Kroeger said the photograph he holds up in the music video of himself and his friend Joey Moi with a champagne chiller on Joey's head is the same one he referred to in the lyrics. He also admitted he had broken into his high school to steal money from the office safe eleven times, but "half a dozen" flowed better for the lyrics.

Chart performance
The single became the band's third top ten hit in the United States, peaking at number two on the Billboard Hot 100 chart. "Photograph" has sold over 1.4 million digital downloads in the U.S., according to Nielsen SoundScan, though it is certified double platinum by the Recording Industry Association of America. "Photograph", was the first of three top ten hits from All the Right Reasons in New Zealand, peaking at number four.

The song also topped the Billboard Mainstream Rock Tracks and Pop 100 charts. The single was also a huge success on the Canadian charts, peaking at number-one and staying there for seven weeks.

In 2008, the single was once again showing on future single release lists in the UK. The single was re-released on June 23, 2008 to capitalise on the success of "Rockstar". "Photograph" was added to the C-list at BBC Radio 1 on May 21, 2008, climbing to the B-list the following week, and then to the A-List. It was also added to the BBC Radio 2 C-list. "Photograph" originally peaked at number 29 upon its first release, three years earlier. The song re-entered the UK Singles Chart at number 52 on June 10, 2008, climbed to number 29 a week later and reached a peak of number 18, two weeks after the physical release, out peaking the original release of the song.

Music video
The music video begins with Chad Kroeger, the video's protagonist, walking along a lonely, sparsely populated street, holding up a photograph of himself and Nickelback's producer, Joey Moi (who is referred to in the line "And what the hell is on Joey's head?"). As the song progresses to the line "And this is where I grew up," he walks to a rusty mailbox, addressed as number 29025. As he speaks of sneaking out, the camera does not show the house itself but does show a view from the inside looking out at him, possibly suggesting someone else lives there now. He continues walking and comes to an older building marked as "Hanna High School" on the front (it's now the Community Services Building: 210 6 Avenue East, Hanna, Alberta, Canada) announcing, "And this is where I went to school." He and his three other band members enter the gym with their gear and put on a seemingly impromptu concert alone. During the chorus, two band members go to an old junkyard and reminisce about a field where the rest of the band and their girlfriends are partying. Another experiences a similar event near an abandoned train yard, seeing his old girlfriend (most likely Kim, who was "the first girl I kissed") run near the tracks and kiss his younger self. The Hanna Roundhouse is shown. The camera then switches to flashbacks of various people ("I miss that town, I miss the faces") As the video ends, the flashback people get in their cars to go home as the band finishes the song.

The video was directed by Nigel Dick and was filmed in Hanna, Alberta, Canada, hometown to most of the band.

One particular shot from the video, with Kroeger holding up a picture frame at the lyric "Look at this photograph", became an Internet meme, with users replacing the contents of the frame with other pictures. At the time of the song's release, the meme has been part of the general negative attitudes towards the band, and as attitudes towards the band shifted towards more favorable appreciation, the meme was still used for humorous purposes.

Legacy

Use by Donald Trump
In early October 2019, United States President Donald Trump used a portion of the music video and song within a video posted on his Twitter account with the opening four words of the song in all caps as the video's caption for the tweet as used in the Internet meme taken from the video. The video was about former Vice President (and, later, President of the United States) Joe Biden and his son Hunter. The photo shows them on a golf course with Devon Archer of Burisma Holdings and raises the question about the precise nature of latter's past relations with Ukraine while also taking a shot at the elder Biden's appearance with the lyrics "What the hell is on Joey's head?". 

The video containing the music video and song was subsequently taken off Twitter with the following message given in place of the video as the reason for its removal from Twitter: "This media has been disabled in response to a report by the copyright owner." This entire series of actions, the posting of the video and its removal, was met with a significant rise in digital on-demand streaming of the song and music video as well as digital download sales of the song compared to streamings and downloads on the days before the tweet.

Google Photos
The band created a parody of the song for a Google Photos advertisement released in December 2020, with the lyrics making fun of Kroeger's own photographic history, including his noodle-like hair.

Track listings
CD single
 "Photograph" [album version] – 4:21
 "Photograph" [edit] – 3:55
 "We Will Rock You" – 2:01
 "Photograph" [video]

2008 CD single (UK re-release)
 "Photograph" [radio mix] – 3:49
 "We Will Rock You" – 4:29

Charts and certifications

Weekly charts

Year-end charts

All-time charts

Certifications

Release history

References

2000s ballads
Rock ballads
2005 singles
2005 songs
Nickelback songs
Music videos directed by Nigel Dick
Roadrunner Records singles
Songs about nostalgia
Songs about school
Songs based on actual events
Songs written by Chad Kroeger
Songs written by Daniel Adair
Songs written by Mike Kroeger
Songs written by Ryan Peake
Internet memes introduced in 2005